Callistosporium vinosobrunneum is a species of agaric fungus in the Catathelasmataceae family.  Newly described to science in 2011, it is known only from  Hawaiian montane wet forests on the islands of Hawaii and Kauai.

Taxonomy
The species was first described scientifically by mycologists Dennis Desjardin and Don Hemmes in 2011 in Mycologia. Desjardin collected the holotype specimen in Kauai, in Kōkee State Park in January 2009. The specific epithet vinosobrunneum refers to the dark reddish-brown color of the fruit bodies.

Description
The cap surface is smooth, moist, and hygrophanous. Dark reddish-brown near the center, the color fades slightly approaching the margin. The flesh is thin—between 0.5 and 1 mm—and pale grayish to reddish brown. The gills are adnexed or sinuate, seceding in maturity. They are somewhat distantly spaced, with two to four series of interspersed lamellulae (short gills). The gills are reddish brown, and may have a lavender tint. The mushroom lacks any distinctive taste or odor.

The spores are ovoid (egg-shaped), smooth, hyaline (translucent), thin-walled, and contain one oil droplet; they measure 6.5–8 by 5–6.5 μm. The basidia (spore-bearing cells) are club-shaped, four-spored with sterigma that are 2.5–5 μm long, and measure 27–36 by 8–10 μm.

Distribution and habitat
C. vinosobrunneum grows solitarily to scattered on the rotting wood of the flowering evergreen tree ōhia lehua (Metrosideros polymorpha). It is endemic to the islands of Hawaii and Kauai.

References

External links

Fungi described in 2011
Fungi of Oceania
Tricholomataceae